The 1950 Alabama Crimson Tide baseball team is a baseball team that represented the University of Alabama in the 1950 NCAA baseball season. The Crimson Tide were members of the Southeastern Conference and played their home games at Sewell–Thomas Stadium in Tuscaloosa, Alabama. They were led by twelfth-year head coach Tilden Campbell.

Roster

Schedule 

! style="" | Regular Season
|- valign="top" 

|- align="center" bgcolor="#ffcccc"
| 1 || March 20 || at  || Conrad Park • DeLand, Florida || 2–3 || 0–1 || –
|- align="center" bgcolor="#ccffcc"
| 2 || March 21 || at Stetson || Conrad Park • DeLand, Florida || 10–5 || 1–1 || –
|- align="center" bgcolor="#ffcccc"
| 3 || March 23 || at  || Harper-Shepherd Field • Winter Park, Florida || 4–8 || 1–2 || –
|- align="center" bgcolor="#ffcccc"
| 4 || March 24 || at Rollins || Harper-Shepherd Field • Winter Park, Florida || 1–2 || 1–3 || –
|- align="center" bgcolor="#ccffcc"
| 5 || March 25 || at Rollins || Harper-Shepherd Field • Winter Park, Florida || 10–4 || 2–3 || –
|-

|- align="center" bgcolor="#ffcccc"
| 6 || April 5 || at Birmingham Barons || Rickwood Field • Birmingham, Alabama || 5–23 || 2–4 || –
|- align="center" bgcolor="#ccffcc"
| 7 || April 7 || at  || Alex Box Stadium • Baton Rouge, Louisiana || 5–4 || 3–4 || 1–0
|- align="center" bgcolor="#ccffcc"
| 8 || April 8 || at LSU || Alex Box Stadium • Baton Rouge, Louisiana || 5–3 || 4–4 || 2–0
|- align="center" bgcolor="#ffcccc"
| 9 || April 11 || Birmingham Barons || Sewell–Thomas Stadium • Tuscaloosa, Alabama || 5–24 || 4–5 || 2–0
|- align="center" bgcolor="#ccffcc"
| 10 || April 12 || Andalusia || Sewell–Thomas Stadium • Tuscaloosa, Alabama || 24–10 || 5–5 || 2–0
|- align="center" bgcolor="#ccffcc"
| 11 || April 14 || LSU || Sewell–Thomas Stadium • Tuscaloosa, Alabama || 5–3 || 6–5 || 3–0
|- align="center" bgcolor="#ccffcc"
| 12 || April 15 || LSU || Sewell–Thomas Stadium • Tuscaloosa, Alabama || 13–11 || 7–5 || 4–0
|- align="center" bgcolor="#ffcccc"
| 13 || April 17 ||  || Sewell–Thomas Stadium • Tuscaloosa, Alabama || 3–15 || 7–6 || 4–1
|- align="center" bgcolor="#ccffcc"
| 14 || April 18 || Ole Miss || Sewell–Thomas Stadium • Tuscaloosa, Alabama || 9–0 || 8–6 || 5–1
|- align="center" bgcolor="#ccffcc"
| 15 || April 21 ||  || Sewell–Thomas Stadium • Tuscaloosa, Alabama || 6–3 || 9–6 || 6–1
|- align="center" bgcolor="#ffcccc"
| 16 || April 22 || Mississippi State || Sewell–Thomas Stadium • Tuscaloosa, Alabama || 0–1 || 9–7 || 6–2
|- align="center" bgcolor="#ccffcc"
| 17 || April 28 ||  || Sewell–Thomas Stadium • Tuscaloosa, Alabama || 7–2 || 10–7 || 7–2
|- align="center" bgcolor="#ccffcc"
| 18 || April 29 || Florida || Sewell–Thomas Stadium • Tuscaloosa, Alabama || 3–2 || 11–7 || 8–2
|-

|- align="center" bgcolor="#ccffcc"
| 19 || May 2 || at  || Plainsman Park • Auburn, Alabama || 17–1 || 12–7 || 9–2
|- align="center" bgcolor="#ccffcc"
| 20 || May 3 || at Auburn || Plainsman Park • Auburn, Alabama || 17–0 || 13–7 || 10–2
|- align="center" bgcolor="#ccffcc"
| 21 || May 4 || Ole Miss || Sewell–Thomas Stadium • Tuscaloosa, Alabama || 15–1 || 14–7 || 11–2
|- align="center" bgcolor="#ffcccc"
| 22 || May 5 || Ole Miss || Sewell–Thomas Stadium • Tuscaloosa, Alabama || 1–6 || 14–8 || 11–3
|- align="center" bgcolor="#ccffcc"
| 23 || May 13 || Auburn || Sewell–Thomas Stadium • Tuscaloosa, Alabama || 9–7 || 15–8 || 12–3
|- align="center" bgcolor="#ccffcc"
| 24 || May 15 || at Mississippi State || Unknown • Starkville, Mississippi || 11–5 || 16–8 || 13–3
|- align="center" bgcolor="#ffcccc"
| 25 || May 16 || at Mississippi State || Unknown • Starkville, Mississippi || 4–5 || 16–9 || 13–4
|-

|-
! style="" | Postseason
|- valign="top"

|- align="center" bgcolor="#ccffcc"
| 26 || May 23 ||  || Sewell–Thomas Stadium • Tuscaloosa, Alabama || 4–1 || 17–9 || 13–4
|- align="center" bgcolor="#ccffcc"
| 27 || May 24 || Kentucky || Sewell–Thomas Stadium • Tuscaloosa, Alabama || 13–0 || 18–9 || 13–4
|- align="center" bgcolor="#ffcccc"
| 28 || May 26 || at Kentucky || Unknown • Lexington, Kentucky || 3–14 || 18–10 || 13–4
|- align="center" bgcolor="#ccffcc"
| 29 || May 27 || at Kentucky || Unknown • Lexington, Kentucky || 9–1 || 19–10 || 13–4
|-

|- align="center" bgcolor="#ccffcc"
| 30 || June 8 || vs  || Sims Legion Park • Gastonia, North Carolina || 6–1 || 20–10 || 13–4
|- align="center" bgcolor="#ccffcc"
| 31 || June 9 || vs  || Sims Legion Park • Gastonia, North Carolina || 3–2 || 21–10 || 13–4
|- align="center" bgcolor="#ccffcc"
| 32 || June 10 || vs Wake Forest || Sims Legion Park • Gastonia, North Carolina || 5–4 || 22–10 || 13–4
|-

|- align="center" bgcolor="#ccffcc"
| 33 || June 16 || vs Bradley || Johnny Rosenblatt Stadium • Omaha, Nebraska || 9–2 || 23–10 || 13–4
|- align="center" bgcolor="#ffcccc"
| 34 || June 18 || vs Washington State || Johnny Rosenblatt Stadium • Omaha, Nebraska || 1–9 || 23–11 || 13–4
|- align="center" bgcolor="#ffcccc"
| 35 || June 19 || vs Wisconsin || Johnny Rosenblatt Stadium • Omaha, Nebraska || 1–3 || 23–12 || 13–4
|-

Awards and honors 
Ned Folmar
 District III All-Tournament Team

Al Lary
 District III All-Tournament Team

Frank Lary
 ABCA All-South Region Team

Mike Mizraney
 District III All-Tournament Team

Ed White
 ABCA First Team All-American
 ABCA All-South Region Team
 District III All-Tournament Team

References 

Alabama
Alabama Crimson Tide baseball seasons
Alabama Crimson Tide baseball
College World Series seasons
Southeastern Conference baseball champion seasons